Lu Jiaxi may refer to:
 Lu Jiaxi (chemist)
 Lu Jiaxi (mathematician)